Muzamiru Kibeedi Mutangula, also Muzamiru Mutangula   Kibeedi,  is a Ugandan lawyer and judge, who, on 4 October 2019, was nominated to sit on the Uganda Court of Appeal.

Background and education
He graduated from the Faculty of Law of Makerere University, Uganda's largest and oldest public university, with a Bachelor of Laws. He also holds a Diploma in Legal Practice by the Law Development Centre in Kampala, Uganda's capital city.

Career
Prior to his ascension to the bench, Kibeedi was in private legal practice for over 26 years, dating back to 1993. His practice has included Constitutional Rights Enforcement Litigation, Property Development and Taxation Planning, Civil Corporate Defence and Civil Defence of High Net-Worth Individuals.

See also
Irene Mulyagonja
Monica Mugenyi
Ministry of Justice and Constitutional Affairs (Uganda)

References

External links
Museveni Names 15 Judges, Sends IGG Irene Mulyagonja to Court of Appeal As of 5 October 2019.

20th-century Ugandan lawyers
21st-century Ugandan judges
1967 births
Living people
Makerere University alumni
Law Development Centre alumni
People from Eastern Region, Uganda
Justices of the Court of Appeal of Uganda